Whitney Blake (born Nancy Ann Whitney; February 20, 1926 – September 28, 2002) was an American film and television actress, director, and producer. She is known for her four seasons portraying Dorothy Baxter, the mother, on the 1960s sitcom Hazel, and as co-creator and writer of the sitcom One Day at a Time. With her first husband she had three children, including actress Meredith Baxter.

Early life
Blake was born in Eagle Rock, Los Angeles. She was the first child of Martha Mae Whitney (née Wilkerson) and Harry C. Whitney, a United States Secret Service agent who had guarded President Woodrow Wilson, his wife, and other political officials. Blake and her younger brother traveled around the country extensively, during which time she attended 16 different schools. While attending Pasadena City College, she worked in small theater groups in the Los Angeles area. In the summer, she worked at her mother's ice-cream stand in McMinnville, Oregon.

Acting
Blake gained acting experience with five years of work in little-theater productions. In 1953, she was in several productions at the Pasadena Playhouse. After her appearance in an amateur Hollywood production of The Women caught the attention of agent Sid Gold, she appeared on a number of television series, including the syndicated Johnny Midnight, Sheriff of Cochise, twice on Rod Cameron's State Trooper, and on the David Janssen crime drama Richard Diamond, Private Detective. Her first television appearance was on NBC Matinee Theater.

Blake was cast in My Gun Is Quick, the film version of a Mike Hammer novel by Mickey Spillane.

In 1957, she appeared in the first episode of CBS's Perry Mason, "The Case of the Restless Redhead," in the title role of Evelyn Bagby, the defendant. In 1958, she again appeared in the title role as defendant Diana Reynolds in the episode "The Case of the Black-Eyed Blonde."

In 1957, she played Lilli Bridgeman, who hires a professional assassin to murder her husband, Les (Alan Hale, Jr.), so she can marry a rival rancher, Kiley Rand (Don Megowan), in the episode "Hired Gun" of the ABC/Warner Bros. Western series, Cheyenne, starring Clint Walker.

Blake played leading lady to James Garner in "The Day They Hanged Bret Maverick," the second-season opener in 1958 for the ABC/WB Western series, Maverick.

She appeared with Claude Akins in two 1959 episodes, "Cattle Drive" and "Border Incident," of the CBS Western The Texan, starring Rory Calhoun.

In 1959, Blake guest-starred in the first episode, "The Good Samaritan," of the syndicated Western series Pony Express. That same year, her guest appearance in the short-lived series The D.A.'s Man garnered her an Emmy nomination.

She appeared in a Gunsmoke episode called "Wind" in March 1959. Blake played a gambler's lady who tried to shoot Matt Dillon in the back.  She also guest-starred on an episode of the detective series 77 Sunset Strip.

Blake appeared in the 1959 film -30-, with Jack Webb, as a childless couple wanting to adopt a baby. The "-30-" comes from the symbol at the end of a newspaper story, as Webb played a newspaperman in the film. Appeared in the first season of the serie Bonanza, chapter 12.

In 1960, she played Callie Carter in the Rawhide episode "Incident Of The Murder Steer" (Season 2, Episode 28).

Blake guest-starred on Mike Connors' CBS detective series, Tightrope; the CBS sitcom, Pete and Gladys; and on the NBC Western series, Riverboat, starring Darren McGavin; and Overland Trail, with William Bendix and Doug McClure. She performed the lead female dramatic role on the Route 66 TV series in a January 1960 episode (first season). She also guest-starred on police drama TV series M Squad, starring Lee Marvin (Season 3, Episode 25). In 1960,  with Robert Lansing, she co-starred in an episode of the TV series Thriller.

Blake is best remembered for her portrayal of Dorothy Baxter, an interior designer and the wife of George Baxter (Don DeFore), a lawyer, on the NBC sitcom Hazel (1961), starring Shirley Booth in the title role as a bossy maid. Bobby Buntrock played her son, Harold Baxter. Oddly, Blake played Mrs. Baxter on Hazel, which had also been the name of her first husband and the surname of her three children in real life. Following the show's cancellation by NBC in 1965, DeFore and Blake were dropped from the series when CBS picked up the show for one more season. They were replaced by Ray Fulmer and Lynn Borden, respectively, in the roles of Steve and Barbara Baxter, the younger brother and sister-in-law of George Baxter.

After Hazel, Blake guest-starred in an episode of the ABC Western series The Legend of Jesse James. In 1966, she appeared in the episode "Nice Day for a Hanging" of Chuck Connors' NBC Western series, Branded. In 1968, she appeared in a final season episode of The Andy Griffith Show as an attractive lawyer in Raleigh named Lee Drake, who Sheriff Andy Taylor has to give a deposition to on a case in Mayberry involving a Raleigh resident. She guest-starred in a 1974 episode of Cannon and in a 1978 episode of Family, a series in which her daughter, Meredith Baxter, co-starred.

Later career
As demand for her work in network television and films waned, Whitney Blake became a Los Angeles television talk-show host. Later, Blake moved into directing and producing.

For later generations, Blake may be best known for her work in co-creating the television series One Day at a Time with her husband, Allan Manings. The sitcom ran for nine seasons on the CBS network and made household names of its stars: Bonnie Franklin, Mackenzie Phillips, Valerie Bertinelli, and Pat Harrington.

Personal life
Blake married Tom Baxter in early 1944. They had three children: sons, Richard Whitney Baxter and Brian Thomas Baxter and daughter, Meredith Ann Baxter. In 1988, her son Brian began co-ownership (with Blake) in a Minneapolis bookstore, Baxter's Books, which closed in 1998. Her daughter, Meredith, became an actress, starring in the 1980s sitcom Family Ties.

In 1957, Blake married talent agent Jack X Fields; they divorced in 1967.

Singer Whitney Houston (1963-2012) was named after Blake, as stated in the 2018 documentary Whitney.

From August 24, 1968, until her death in 2002, she was married to writer/collaborator Allan Manings.

Illness and death
On Whitney Blake's 76th birthday, her children took Blake and Manings to dinner. Later that evening, she revealed that she had been diagnosed with esophageal cancer. She expressed confidence that she would beat the disease, but died seven months later. She experienced great discomfort during her final months. Manings told Meredith, his stepdaughter, that the most difficult day was when he told Whitney that he had to accept hospice care for her; that’s when she realized that her condition was terminal.

Blake died at her home on September 28, 2002, in Edgartown, Massachusetts. She was cremated, and her ashes were kept by her family. Manings also suffered from esophageal cancer and died eight years later.

Filmography

References

External links
 
 Glamour Girls of the Silver Screen

1926 births
2002 deaths
Actresses from Los Angeles
American film actresses
Film producers from California
American television actresses
Television producers from California
American women television producers
Deaths from cancer in Massachusetts
Deaths from esophageal cancer
Film directors from California
20th-century American actresses
People from Edgartown, Massachusetts
Film directors from Massachusetts
American women film producers
Film producers from Massachusetts